Eudeilinia herminiata, the northern eudeilinia, is a moth in the family Drepanidae. It was described by Achille Guenée in 1857. It is found in North America, where it has been recorded from British Columbia to Newfoundland, south to Florida and west to Texas. The habitat consists of deciduous woods and wood edges.

The wingspan is 25–30 mm. Adults have pure white wings, the wing markings limited to interrupted orange-yellow to brown antemedial and postmedial lines. Adults are on wing from April to September in one generation per year.

The larvae feed on Cornus species.

References

Moths described in 1857
Drepaninae